The 1929–30 season was the 56th season of competitive football by Rangers.

Overview

Results
All results are written with Rangers' score first.

Scottish League Division One

Scottish Cup

Appearances

See also
 1929–30 in Scottish football
 1929–30 Scottish Cup

Scottish football championship-winning seasons
Rangers F.C. seasons
Rangers